John Gibbes (21 June 1696 – 18 December 1764) was an English military officer and colonial leader in the Province of Carolina. He was the son of governor Robert Gibbes. John Gibbes was a colonel, a wealthy plantation owner, a member of the Royal Assembly and Council, and a deputy Lord proprietor. In 1719 he married Mary Woodward, a granddaughter of Henry Woodward, the first white settler of Carolina.

References

South Carolina colonial people
1696 births
1764 deaths